Forget Cassettes is an alternative rock band from Nashville, Tennessee, formed in 2001. Fronted by Beth Cameron, formerly of Fair Verona and the only constant member of the group, Forget Cassettes have released three albums: Instruments of Action (2003), Salt (2006) and O Cursa (2013). The first two were released on the Nashville-based Theory 8 Records label. Salt has been re-released in Europe by Tangled Up! Recordings in March 2007.

The band has toured extensively throughout the US and Europe, most notably with ...And You Will Know Us by the Trail of Dead (whose second percussionist, Doni Schroader, has played with Cameron in both Fair Verona and Forget Cassettes).

Forget Cassettes started life as a two-piece, but when Schroader quit to join ...Trail of Dead on a full-time basis, Cameron temporarily split the group altogether. After a few months' break from the music business, she recruited Aaron Ford and Jay Leo Phillips, then involved with Apollo Up!, in 2005 — both of whom are noted local musicians in Nashville — and began work on Forget Cassettes' second record. Following its release in 2006, Schroader returned to play with the band sporadically, most notably on its tour of Europe in February and March 2007.

Cameron and Scroader reunited in 2008 under the name Eliza the Arrow.

A third Forget Cassettes album, titled O Cursa is the band's first to not predominantly feature live drums and guitar.

Band members
Beth Cameron (guitar, vocals, keys)
Aaron Ford (drums)
Jay Leo Phillips (bass, guitar, keys, backing vocals)
Doni Schroader (drums, percussion, backing vocals, keys)
Jason Milan Dietz (bass and keys 2007)

Discography
 Instruments of Action (2003)
 Salt (2006)
 O Cursa (2013)

External links
Official website
Page at Theory 8 Records
Official MySpace
Tangled Up! Recordings MySpace

Indie rock musical groups from Tennessee
Musical groups established in 2001
Musical groups from Nashville, Tennessee
Rock music duos